The R321 is a Regional Route in South Africa that connects Grabouw in the south-west to the R45 between Franschhoek and Villiersdorp in the north-east.

From its southern origin at the N2, it runs along the eastern edge of Grabouw heading north-east. It crosses the dam wall of Theewaterskloof Dam after which it immediately ends, reaching the R45.

External links
 Routes Travel Info

References
 

Regional Routes in the Western Cape